Bruno Gazzotti (born 16 September 1970) is a Belgian comic book artist.

He has drawn several popular comic book series, such as Soda  and Seuls.

Childhood 
Gazzotti's Italian grandfather had been a miner, and his father lived in Belgium from a very early age. Both his parents were sport instructors, and comic enthusiasts. As a child, Gazzotti was himself very interested in Franco-Belgian comics such as Tintin. In 1988, he was hired by Spirou's editor in chief Patrick Pinchart, who, after seeing the portfolio, commissioned a few illustrations. He had previously studied at Institut Saint Luc in Liège.

Early career 
Shortly after, he drew Le petit Spirou ( from the 20th strip onwards ), with writers Janry and Tome. It was with the latter he then became the artist for a  Semi-realistic series about a New York policeman, Soda, in 1989.

2000 onwards 
Gazzotti continued drawing Soda until 2005, with "Apocalypse Code", the series' 12th album. This was despite him saying, shortly after the comic's release, "I should normally continue the series, as we have found an agreement to continue that satisfies everyone." The comic was later continued by Tome and Dan Verlinden.

In January 2006, he and writer Fabien Vehlmann released the first episode of a new saga, Seuls, about a group of teenagers who try surviving in a world where adults have disappeared. It was very successfully both commercially and critically.

Prizes 

2007: "Prix jeunesse du festival d'Angouleme"

References

1970 births
Living people
Belgian comics artists
Belgian people of Italian descent